"Tanha Dil Tanha Safar" is a song by Indian singer Shaan, the first track on his 2000 album Tanha Dil. The song is sung and written by Shaan and composed by Ram Sampath. It was originally released as a single on 2 January 2000. Shaan believes that "Tanha Dil Tanha Safar" will "remain my all-time greatest hit" The song was sampled by British singer Melanie C for her song "Yeh Yeh Yeh".

"Tanha Dil Tanha Safar 2.0"
A reworked version of "Tanha Dil Tanha Safar" was originally scheduled to be released on 27 October 2021 as "Tanha Dil Tanha Safar 2.0", but it was postponed and released on 9 November 2021. In the new version, the song will be completely different from the original version, and highlights mental health.

References

2000 songs
Hindi songs